Birinci Mahmudlu (also, Birindzhi-Makhmudlu, Makhmudlu Pervoye, and Makhmudly Pervyy) is a village and municipality in the Fuzuli District of Azerbaijan. It has a population of 1,091.

References 

Populated places in Fuzuli District